Brice Hermann Tchétché Kipré (born 16 December 1987) is an Ivorian professional footballer who plays as a forward for Malaysia Super League club Kuala Lumpur City. Besides Ivory Coast, he has played in Tanzania, Oman, and Malaysia.

Career
On 21 January 2020, Kipré Tchétché scored a hat-trick for Kedah Darul Aman against Tai Po in the 2020 AFC Champions League preliminary round 2 match, helping his club to win 5-1 and progress to the next round.

Career statistics

Club

Honours

Club
Al-Suwaiq
Sultan Qaboos Cup: 2016-17

References

External links
 

1987 births
Living people
Ivorian footballers
Ivorian expatriate footballers
Association football forwards
Ivorian expatriate sportspeople in Malaysia
Expatriate footballers in Malaysia
Expatriate footballers in Oman
Expatriate footballers in Tanzania
Azam F.C. players
Suwaiq Club players
Malaysia Super League players
Terengganu FC players
Kedah Darul Aman F.C. players
Kuala Lumpur City F.C. players